Ryan Cleo Bowen (born November 20, 1975) is an American former professional basketball player who is currently an assistant coach for the Denver Nuggets of the National Basketball Association (NBA). He was a 6'9",  power forward.

College career
Bowen played college basketball at the University of Iowa, where he finished in the top 10 of career blocks and rebounds, and continues to hold the record in career steals. In his senior year at Iowa, Bowen averaged 14.4 points, 8.7 rebounds, and 2.5 assists per game.

Professional career

Europe
Bowen was a second-round draft pick of the Denver Nuggets in the 1998 NBA Draft, but he played his rookie season at Oyak Renault in the Turkish Basketball League before joining the Nuggets in 1999.

In January 2007, after being released by the Rockets, he was signed by TAU Cerámica to a two-month deal in advance of the Euroleague top 16, in which they had already secured a top seed. The team has the option to extend the contract through the end of the European season. Because of an injury he left Spain and in March 2007, he signed with Ironi Naharia of the Israel Premier League. During his stay with the team, he kept a blog of his experiences in Israel. He was waived in May 2007 by Naharia.

Denver Nuggets / Houston Rockets
After his stint on Turkey, he signed with the Nuggets in 1999. and played five seasons there before being picked up by the Houston Rockets. After two seasons with Houston, Bowen was released before the 2006–07 NBA season began.

New Orleans Hornets
In the 2007 NBA offseason, Bowen signed with the New Orleans Hornets as a free agent.

Oklahoma City Thunder
In the 2009 NBA offseason, Bowen was a non-roster invite with the Oklahoma City Thunder and after training camp was offered a one-year contract. He was waived on November 25, 2009.

Post-playing career
Shortly after retiring from the NBA, Ryan took his talents to Iowa City to become the video coordinator for the University of Iowa shortly after Fran McCaffery took over. After spending a year plus in Iowa City working for the Hawkeyes, Ryan was hired as an assistant coach by the Denver Nuggets in December 2011. On August 21, 2013, Bowen was hired as an assistant coach and assistant director of player development by the Sacramento Kings. In July 2015, Bowen returned to the Denver Nuggets as an assistant following Denver's hire of Mike Malone as the head coach, he coached the Denver Nuggets 2022 Summer League team.

Off the court
Ryan Bowen has an older brother and an older sister, and has had a daughter and two sons with his wife Wendy.  He was awarded the Chopper Travaglini Award for his work in the Denver community, and has established the Ryan Bowen Family Foundation to help sponsor youth athletics, athletic facilities and college scholarships for children in southeastern Iowa and Denver, Colorado. The foundation also sponsors the "Floor Burns" basketball camp, which is held every summer in Iowa.

NBA career statistics

Regular season 

|-
| align="left" | 1999–00
| align="left" | Denver
| 52 || 0 || 11.3 || .393 || .111 || .717 || 2.2 || .4 || .8 || .3 || 2.5
|-
| align="left" | 2000–01
| align="left" | Denver
| 57 || 0 || 12.2 || .556 || .364 || .614 || 2.0 || .5 || .6 || .2 || 3.4
|-
| align="left" | 2001–02
| align="left" | Denver
| 75 || 21 || 22.5 || .479 || .083 || .750 || 4.0 || .7 || 1.0 || .5 || 4.9
|-
| align="left" | 2002–03
| align="left" | Denver
| 62 || 31 || 16.1 || .492 || .286 || .659 || 2.5 || .9 || 1.0 || .5 || 3.6
|-
| align="left" | 2003–04
| align="left" | Denver
| 52 || 1 || 7.5 || .340 || .000 || .833 || 1.7 || .3 || .3 || .3 || .9
|-
| align="left" | 2004–05
| align="left" | Houston
| 66 || 6 || 9.2 || .423 || .500 || .667 || 1.2 || .3 || .3 || .1 || 1.7
|-
| align="left" | 2005–06
| align="left" | Houston
| 68 || 19 || 9.6 || .298 || .136 || .786 || 1.3 || .4 || .3 || .1 || 1.3
|-
| align="left" | 2007–08
| align="left" | New Orleans
| 53 || 4 || 12.5 || .490 || .000 || .552 || 1.9 || .5 || .6 || .2 || 2.2
|-
| align="left" | 2008–09
| align="left" | New Orleans
| 21 || 3 || 10.4 || .579 || .000 || .600 || 1.1 || .4 || .7 || .2 || 2.2
|-
| align="left" | 2009–10
| align="left" | Oklahoma City
| 1 || 0 || 8.0 || 1.000 || .000 || 1.000 || 2.0 || .0 || 1.0 || .0 || 4.0
|- class="sortbottom"
| style="text-align:center;" colspan="2"| Career
| 507 || 85 || 12.8 || .456 || .206 || .693 || 2.1 || .5 || .6 || .3 || 2.6

Playoffs 

|-
| align="left" | 2004
| align="left" | Denver
| 4 || 0 || 1.5 || 1.000 || .000 || .000 || .0 || .0 || .0 || .0 || .5
|-
| align="left" | 2005
| align="left" | Houston
| 7 || 3 || 17.9 || .320 || .000 || .667 || 2.0 || .9 || .9 || .0 || 2.6
|-
| align="left" | 2008
| align="left" | New Orleans
| 9 || 0 || 4.3 || .167 || .000 || 1.000 || 1.6 || .2 || .1 || .0 || .4
|-
| align="left" | 2009
| align="left" | New Orleans
| 1 || 0 || 2.0 || .000 || .000 || .000 || .0 || .0 || .0 || .0 || .0
|- class="sortbottom"
| style="text-align:center;" colspan="2"| Career
| 21 || 3 || 8.2 || .303 || .000 || .800 || 1.3 || .4 || .3 || .0 || 1.1

References

External links
 NBA biography (1999-2009, in brief)
 NBA biography (1999-2006, in depth)
 Ryan Bowen official site
 Iowa Hawkeyes player profile

1975 births
Living people
American expatriate basketball people in Israel
American expatriate basketball people in Spain
American expatriate basketball people in Turkey
American men's basketball players
Basketball coaches from Iowa
Basketball players from Iowa
Denver Nuggets assistant coaches
Denver Nuggets draft picks
Denver Nuggets players
Houston Rockets players
Iowa Hawkeyes men's basketball players
Ironi Nahariya players
Israeli Basketball Premier League players
Liga ACB players
New Orleans Hornets players
Oklahoma City Thunder players
Oyak Renault basketball players
People from Fort Madison, Iowa
Power forwards (basketball)
Sacramento Kings assistant coaches
Saski Baskonia players